Waiata : Maori Showbands, Balladeers & Pop Stars is a compilation album of historical performances by various artists released on compact disc in 2001 by the His Master's Voice and EMI labels. It features recordings by  Prince Tui Teka, the Maori Volcanics, the Howard Morrison Quartet, The Quin Tikis, Billy T. James, and John Rowles.

Waiata : Maori Showbands, Balladeers & Pop Stars

General info
The album has been described as the first ever complete retrospective of popular Maori artists such as show bands, balladeers, and pop stars, covering the period from 1955 to the early 1980s. The musicians on the album range from rock‘n rollers, crooners and jazz musicians. It is representative of an era where Maori musicians were popular in dance halls, clubs and cabarets both in New Zealand and overseas.  The first disc is more of the 1950s rock and roll and harmony vocal style, while the second disc is more in the seventies rhythm sound and some of the disco genre. On 5 September 2011, the album had dropped from chart position 6 to 7 in the Compilation Albums section.

Compiling the material
The music was compiled by Grant Gillanders, a music archivist based in Auckland. He had to employ a bit of detective work to track down the artists and their families. An example of what he came across was a song by Maori Allblack George Nēpia. The song, "Beneath the Maori Moon" was recorded at Decca Studios in London. Supposedly licensed to Decca, Gillanders found out that Decca had no record of the licensing agreement so the ownership of the song now belongs to the Nēpia family which gives them the right to license it to music collections or film, etc. His involvement in the project was approximately five years.

Mastering and production
It was mastered by Simon Lynch and Robert Stebbing at Stebbing Recording Centre, with vinyl transfers by Steve McGough. It was manufactured and distributed by EMI.

Disc info
His Master's Voice 50999 6802952 4, EMI – 50999 68029522011

Waiata 2 : Maori Showbands, Balladeers & Pop Stars

General info
The review on the Elsewhere site gives the impression that the album is more in the MOR vein. Among the artists is Frankie Price who is the older brother of John Rowles. The album also includes "Hollywood Dreams" which was the final single release for Golden Harvest. The album received a 3/5 star rating from Stephanie Arthur-Worsop of The Aucklander.

Compiling the material
The album was compiled by Grant Gillanders.

Mastering and production
Mastering and tape transfers were made at Stebbing Recording Center. The tape transfers were done by Steve McGough and the mastering by Simon Lynch. It was published in New Zealand by Sony Music Entertainment in 2013. Grant Gillanders produced the album for Frenzy Music Productions.

Disc info

References

External links
 WAIATA (Maori Showbands, Balladeers & Pop Stars)

EMI Records albums
Pop albums by New Zealand artists
Māori music
2011 albums
Compilation albums by New Zealand artists
Māori-language albums